The Fixed Future (Korean: 정해진 미래) is a book published in 2016, written by Cho Young-tae. The book introduces Korea's future from a demographic perspective. In this book, the author argues that the future of Korea is somewhat set and predictable, and is negative from a demographic perspective, but the future of individuals is not set. Young-tae also states that the future may vary depending on what choices an individual makes in the fixed future. The book was not translated into English.

Author 
Cho Young-tae is a professor at Seoul National University's Graduate School of Public Health and a demographer. He graduated from Korea University with a degree in sociology, earned a master's degree in sociology from the University of Texas in the U.S. and a Ph.D. in demography. He has been a professor at Seoul National University's Graduate School of Public Health since 2004. It is researching to predict future society through characteristics of population fluctuation in countries such as the U.S., Japan, China, and Vietnam as well as Korea It is also exploring academic questions about how personal health-related big data collected on mobile devices will affect the health sector.

He wrote "The Fixed Future" (2016, Bookstone), and "The Opportunity for the Fixed Future Market" (2018, Bookstone).

Contents 
Cho Young-tae said the country's population shape could change to a nuclear family, causing various problems.

In particular, he predicted that the future of education-related jobs would be bleak as the number of children decreased sharply. The military said it could be hit by a decrease in population. However, the shrinking population does not mean that the job market will become more active, he said. There will be a generational clash, and a systematic personnel outflow system is needed for a desirable economy.

The OECD predicted that Korea's growth rate will be in the 1 percent range by the 2020s, and the reason for this is a sharp drop in the production population due to low birth rates. Will it be solved if we accept the production population from abroad? Unfortunately, Cho Young-tae predicts that this will not be the case. The book says Korea's pooling factor that attracts foreigners is weak.

The book says that even if the birth rate is attempted to be increased, the population is already shrinking, therefore decline will be experienced over the next 15 years. Cho Young-tae argues that the social structure should also be downsized to accommodate the population that has already decreased. Young-tae then wrote, "This is not simply about quantitative shrinkage. Rather, it refers to discovering and improving a new constitution tailored to scale."

Related videos 
 Time to Change the World - The set future, future demographics in Korea after 10 years, and the survival strategy | Cho Young-tae, a professor at Seoul National University's Graduate School of Health.
 This is a video of the author speaking based on the book's content. This is how he introduces the lecture: Many experts say that the low birth rate/aging phenomenon will cause the nation to fall into a demographic cliff shortly and that society will become an irrevocably low-growth society. But it's all vague and abstract worries, expectations, and responses. Is our society going to be worse off than it is now? How will today's population affect my personal life in the future? In terms of demographics, this lecture will present a concrete picture of how Korean society will change in 10 years, and here is a necessary view of how the society, as well as the individual, should respond.
 KLAB - Professor Cho Young-tae says the population cliff, is the future for young people to prepare for. 
 The video talks about what young people in Korea, an aging society, should prepare for the future. The author of this book said, "To solve the aging problem, we should have prepared more systems for solving problems in youth life rather than encouraging childbirth. Young people also say they should think about the future to find new opportunities for themselves. In particular, she tells you to look for work that others don't do and challenge."
 EBS Invitation - Population Cliffs, Find Survival Strategies - Demographer Cho Young-tae. 
 The video is about the book's author's survival strategy for aging on EBS's broadcast. In the video, he says, "I tell my daughter to learn Vietnamese. Since the baby boomers retire after at least 20 to 30 years, they must create and challenge their own strengths before that."

Reception 
The book received generally positive reviews. Lee Seung-ok, an honorary professor at Seoul National University and former president of the Korean Association of Population Studies, reviewed the book positively. He said "South Korea spent trillions of won over 10 years to boost the birth rate, but the effect was poor", and stated that the book explained why the population policy failed from a demographic perspective." In addition, Seung-ok recommended the book to readers interested in a new paradigm for the low birth rate issue. The book was also positively reviewed by Daumsoft Vice President Song Kil-young. Song Gil-young said, "It would be nice to read this book when you are afraid of losing human resources in Korea. Let's prepare for each other's better future within the fixed future."

Similarly, Lee Soo-chang, chairman of the Korea Life Insurance Association, rated the book positively. He likened the aging population to a chronic disease that should last more than 10 years. Saying "adaptation" is what society needs today, he also said the author frankly and confidently presents the mindset and strategies he needs to adapt to the age of 100. Choi Sang-o, a researcher from the National Council Human Network Academic Research Institute, said the book presented a new perspective. First, "In the past, if there was a lot of thought about macro issues that the low birth rate and aging population would change, the author deals with individual and daily changes." Second, "The book presents a new response to this change." He said he recommended the book to those who are interested in various ideas because such claims are new. Koica Chairman Lee Mi-kyung said, "The book will provide a chance to think extensively about gender, nationality, and race. Accepting diversity as Korea's external potential will help the current problem."

The economist Hwang Chun-ok considered the book to be "interesting, but not multifaceted" and stated that "the book deals with changes in population policy and changes in population." However, he commented that he had the shortcoming of being unilateral, as he devoted too much weight to economic and educational issues, not his major, for the public. He pointed out that there have been some cases in which some conclusions are far from actual policy and the real economy, and that there could be errors in predictions.

Some of the book's claims were refuted. In an interview with the Joong Ang Ilbo, Cho said the number of students is expected to reach 4.1 million by 2030, which would be 390,000 fewer than the ministry's estimate of 4.49 million. Cho said the Education Ministry calculated it on the wrong basis to maintain the number of teachers. However, Jang Mi-ran, director general of the Education Ministry's teacher policy division, refuted the claim and suggested that "On the basis of the calculation, the statistics on resident registration of the Ministry of Public Administration and Security and the statistics office's future demographic trends are based on the latest data." Cho Jin-seo also described that the "low fertility disaster" does not exist due to changes in the economic structure. Cho quoted economic historian Gregory Clark as saying, 'As the population shrinks, the standard of living and happiness of individual people tends to rise.' At a time when Britain's population was reduced to one-third due to plague and plague, per capita income doubled, raising suspicions about the "low birth disaster" theory, citing that no country has yet collapsed due to low birth rates.

References 

2016 non-fiction books
Demography
Economics books
Economy of South Korea
Korean non-fiction books